A list of films produced in Italy in 1988 (see 1988 in film):

See also
1988 in Italian television

References

Footnotes

Sources

External links
Italian films of 1988 at the Internet Movie Database

1988
Italian
Films